Leptothorax kutteri is a species of ant in the genus Leptothorax. It is endemic to Europe,  Germany, Sweden, and Switzerland.

References

kutteri
Hymenoptera of Europe
Insects described in 1966
Taxonomy articles created by Polbot
Taxobox binomials not recognized by IUCN